Cerityeniyapan is a village in the Şehitkamil District, Gaziantep Province, Turkey. The village is inhabited by Turkmens of the Jerid tribe.

References

Villages in Şehitkamil District